Michael Babatunde (born 24 December 1992) is a Nigerian football midfielder, who plays for Wydad AC in Botola Pro. He has played for various clubs in Nigeria, Ukraine and other countries.

Club career

He was born on December 24, 1992, in Lagos, Nigeria. As a young boy, he tagged along when he turned 5 years old. He was playing soccer with friends, not intimidated by the bigger boys. At the age of 8, he was recruited to join the youth academy club in Lagos. Recognized smaller than most of the kids in his age group, Michael eventually got recognized by a bigger academy  Water FC Academy Abuja, where he was groomed as a professional, later linked with Heartland. He played several games for U-17, U-20 and Super Eagle the National Team of Nigeria. Michael has played a total of 14,420 minutes, has had 188 appearances, 163 lineups, 35 substitutes, 10 substitute out, 25 substitute on the bench, 101 goals, 19 yellow cards, 0 red cards. He has been in Ukraine from 2010 to 2015.

Babatunde moved to Ukraine at the age of 19, signed by Kryvbas Kryvyi Rih of Ukraine from Heartland of Nigeria. He became noted in Ukrainian football after scoring his first goal against FC Chornomorets Odesa, scoring 2 goals at will with the team which lead his club to stay at the Ukrainian Premier League from 2010 to 2013. The club eventually went bankrupt. In 2012–2013, he set a record for most goals to assist in a calendar year, and has scored 6 goals in total at the Ukrainian Premier League from 2010–2015. He later went on a free transfer to Volyn Lutsk. Babatunde signed for Dnipro Dnipropetrovsk in August 2015.

In December 2015, he joined Moroccan club Raja Casablanca. On 31 May 2016, Babatunde joined Qatar SC in the Qatar Stars League. In 2018, Babatunde returned to Morocco to join Wydad AC.

International career
Babatunde is a frequent player in the Nigeria national team, playing for Nigeria in the 2013 FIFA Confederations Cup and the 2014 FIFA World Cup in Brazil.

Honours
Qatar SC
 Qatari Second Division: 2016–17

Wydad
 Botola: 2018–19
 CAF Champions League runner-up: 2018–19

References

External links 
  

1992 births
Living people
Nigerian footballers
Nigeria international footballers
Association football midfielders
Yoruba sportspeople
Nigerian expatriate footballers
Heartland F.C. players
FC Kryvbas Kryvyi Rih players
Ukrainian Premier League players
Expatriate footballers in Ukraine
2011 CAF U-23 Championship players
2013 FIFA Confederations Cup players
2014 FIFA World Cup players
FC Volyn Lutsk players
FC Dnipro players
Nigerian expatriate sportspeople in Ukraine
Raja CA players
Expatriate footballers in Morocco
Nigerian expatriate sportspeople in Morocco
Qatar SC players
Expatriate footballers in Qatar
Nigerian expatriate sportspeople in Qatar
Qatar Stars League players
Qatari Second Division players
Wydad AC players